The M19 Tank Transporter (US supply catalog designation G159) was a heavy tank transporter system used in World War II and into the 1950s. It consisted of a 12-ton 6x4 M20 Diamond T Model 980 truck and companion 12-wheel M9 trailer.

Over 5,000 were produced, and employed by Allied armies throughout all theaters of war.  It was superseded in the U.S. military by the M25 Tank Transporter during the war, but usefully redeployed in other tasks.  It was superseded by the Thornycroft Antar in British service by the early 1950, though a few remained operational in units through 1971.

History
Designed as a heavy prime mover for tank transporting, the hard-cab Diamond T 980 was the product of the Diamond T Company in Chicago. In 1940 the British Purchasing Commission, looking to equip the British Army with a vehicle capable of transporting larger and heavier tanks, approached a number of American truck manufacturers to assess their models. The Diamond T Company had a long history of building rugged, military vehicles for the U.S. Army Quartermaster Corps and had recently produced a prototype heavy vehicle for the US Army which, with a few slight modifications met British requirements and an initial order for 200 was very quickly filled.

The result was the Diamond T 980, a 12-ton hard-cab 6x4 truck.

Specifications (M20 truck)

Engine
The M20 used a Hercules DFXE, a  displacement naturally aspirated
Designed for a British requirement, this was one of the few diesel engines used in US tactical trucks.

Driveline
A two plate dry disk diaphragm spring clutch drove Fuller four-speed main and three-speed auxiliary transmissions. The main transmission had a “low” first gear and three road gears, 4th being direct. The auxiliary had low, direct, and overdrive gears. The low gear allowed several very low gears for extreme off-road use. The direct and overdrive allowed the three road gears to be split, making 6 road gears.

Spicer driveshafts drove two Timken double-reduction axles with an 11.66:1 final drive ratio.

Chassis
The M20 truck had a riveted ladder frame with three beam axles, the front on leaf springs, the rear tandem on leaf springs with locating arms. A pintle hitch of  capacity was mounted on the rear frame crossmember; another pintle hitch was mounted on the front crossmember for positioning the trailer.

All models had Budd split rim disc wheels with 12.20×20-20” tires. Dual rear mud and snow tires were used.

Air powered drum brakes were used on all axles; the trailer brakes could be operated independently of the service brakes. A single disk transmission brake parking brake was also provided.

In the Model 980 it was intended mainly for hauling damaged tanks aboard the trailers. This allowed tank recovery, in addition to loading.

Body
Early trucks used a standard Diamond T commercial cab, also used by the 4-ton G509 trucks. In August 1943 it was replaced with an open military cab. A long butterfly hood had vertical louvres along both sides.

A short ballast body was mounted behind the winch. There were closed tool compartments along both sides, two open containers in the front, and a bottom-hinged tailgate. The spare tire was mounted in the front. The box could hold  of ballast to increase traction on the rear tandem axles.

Specifications (M9 trailer)
The M9 had tandem rear axles and a single front axle on a rotating dolly. Ramps hinged down at the rear end of the trailer. Cable rollers and sheaves let the winch from the M20 truck pull tanks onto the trailer, chocks and chains were used to secure the load.

The front axle suspension system was trailing beam assemblies on coil springs, with a dual tire wheel on each side of the beam. With an assembly on each side there were 4 wheels on the axle line.

The rear tandem beam assembly was a center pivot type, with axles on both ends of the beam. A dual tire wheel was on both ends of both axles, with a beam on each side there were also 4 wheels per axle line. Twenty-four 8.25x15” tires on demountable rims were used, two on each wheel.

Service
Production began in 1941. The first batch was received in Britain in 1942 and very quickly demonstrated their rugged reliability in the British campaign in North Africa. Battle-damaged tanks needed to be quickly recovered, often under hostile fire, and returned to workshops for repair.

5,871 were eventually built by 1945 and were used by virtually every Allied army in every theatre of World War II. U.S. forces in Europe preferred the M25 Tank Transporter, citing the fact that the M19 suffered from a wide turning radius, poor traction of the truck, and excessive rolling resistance. Five  concrete blocks were routinely carried in the bed of the truck to improve traction; the conversion of an M20 truck and M9 trailer to a semi-trailer configuration rather than a trailed configuration alleviated some of these problems, and also improved fuel economy by approximately fifty percent. In general, the M19 was mechanically reliable, but "did not meet the overall requirements of this theater" and was relegated to duty in the rear areas of the combat zone and in the Communications Zone, with the M25 being used for frontline service.

The British Army took delivery of around 1,000 during the war years and many continued in service afterwards, being replaced in the early 1950s with the Thornycroft Antar ("Mighty Antar"), although a few remained in tank transporter units up to 1971. Many of those sold off by the Army after the war were snapped up by heavy haulage and recovery specialists, notably Pickfords and Wynns, and were a familiar sight on Britain's roads, pulling heavy lowloaders and fairground trailers or parked on garage forecourts, in readiness for a heavy rescue operation equipped as wreckers (breakdown recovery trucks).  They suffered from "very limited off-road performance" as a result of only the two rear axles being driven.

Today, many of the 70-year-old Diamond Ts can still be found in private ownership in Britain and frequently appear at historic vehicle shows.

Nomenclature
This combination unit is referred to as the M19 tank transporter, consisting of the M20 tractor and M9 24-wheel trailer. In the nomenclature system used by the United States Army Ordnance Corps Supply Catalog this vehicle is referred as the G159. It was superseded by the M26. After the introduction of the M26, the U.S. relegated M20s to ammunition hauling, for which they proved "tremendous".

British designation for the tractor unit was Diamond T Tractor 6x4 for 40 ton Trailer with "Model 980" or "Model 981" added to distinguish the two. . The British-built trailers were known as "40 ton Trailer British Mk. I (Crane)" "40 ton Trailer British Mk.II (Dyson)"  being manufactured by Cranes of Dereham and R. A. Dyson and Company of Liverpool.

Gallery

See also
Scammell Pioneer
G159, "G" designation
List of U.S. military vehicles by model number#Pre-consecutive trucks

Notes

References
Berndt, Thomas. Standard Catalog of U.S. Military Vehicles 1940–1965. Iola, WI: * Krause Publications, 1993. .

 

TM 9-1825A
TM 9-1827A
TM 9-1829A

External links

http://www.military-museum.org.uk/diamond.htm
http://www.autogallery.org.ru/m/diamond.htm

Military trucks of the United States
Tank transporters
Military vehicles introduced from 1940 to 1944